Lawrence Joseph Staverman (October 11, 1936 – July 12, 2007) was an American professional basketball player and coach. A 6' 7" forward from Villa Madonna College (now known as Thomas More College), Staverman was drafted in the 9th round of the 1958 NBA draft by the Cincinnati Royals. He had a five-year career as a player in the NBA, with the Royals, the Chicago Zephyrs/Baltimore Bullets, and the Detroit Pistons.

Staverman was the first coach of the American Basketball Association's Indiana Pacers. He coached the team for its first season (where they went 38–40 and lost in a three game sweep in the playoffs) and the first nine games of the next season before being replaced by Bobby Leonard. He later served as an interim coach for the Kansas City Kings in the 1977–78 season after they had won just thirteen of 37 games to start the year. He went 18–27	as the Kings finished dead last in the Western Conference. He was replaced by Cotton Fitzsimmons as head coach for the next season, although he stayed with the Kings until May 1981, when he resigned organization to join the Cleveland Browns as an assistant to the team president.

References

External links
 Larry Staverman – National Basketball Association official website
 Larry Staverman (player) – Basketball-Reference.com
 Larry Staverman (coach) – Basketball-Reference.com

1936 births
2007 deaths
American men's basketball coaches
American men's basketball players
Baltimore Bullets (1963–1973) players
Basketball coaches from Kentucky
Basketball players from Kentucky
Cincinnati Royals draft picks
Cincinnati Royals players
Chicago Zephyrs players
Indiana Pacers head coaches
Kansas City Kings head coaches
Kansas City Steers players
Newport Central Catholic High School alumni
People from Newport, Kentucky
Power forwards (basketball)
Thomas More Saints men's basketball players